The Maybank Tigers are a professional men's volleyball team playing major leagues such as the Philippine Super Liga (PSL) and the Premier Volleyball League (PVL). The team is owned by Maybank Philippines and was one of the four pioneer men's teams in the PSL. It debuted in the men's inaugural tournament, the 2013 Grand Prix conference, where it finished in third (bronze) place.

Current roster
For the Premier Volleyball League 1st Season Open Conference:

Coaching staff
 Head coach: Janley Patrona
 Assistant coach(s): Ken Ucang Vic Patrona

Team Staff
 Team manager: Eric Montelibano
 Team Utility: 

Medical Staff
 Team physician:
 Physical Therapist: Michael Maglonzo

Honors

Team
Premier Volleyball League:

Philippine Super Liga:

Individual
Philippine Super Liga:

Team captains
  Michael Maglonzo (2013)
  Alejandro Niňo Mallari (2014)

References

Philippine Super Liga
2013 establishments in the Philippines
Volleyball clubs established in 2013
Maybank